The Rural Municipality of Calder No. 241 is a rural municipality (RM) in the Canadian province of Saskatchewan within Census Division No. 9 and  Division No. 4.

History 
The RM of Calder No. 241 incorporated as a rural municipality on January 1, 1913.

Geography

Communities and localities 
The following urban municipalities are surrounded by the RM.

Villages
 Calder

The following unincorporated communities are within the RM.

Localities
 Kessock
 Wroxton

Demographics 

Government 
The RM of Calder No. 241 is governed by an elected municipal council and an appointed administrator that meets on the second Wednesday of every month. The reeve of the RM is Roy Derworiz while its administrator is Shandy Wegwitz. The RM's office is located in Wroxton.

See also 
List of rural municipalities in Saskatchewan

References

External links 

C

Division No. 9, Saskatchewan